Radio Jura bernois (RJB, meaning literally “Radio Bernese Jura”) is a private French-language radio broadcaster in regional Switzerland.  It broadcasts in Bernese Jura, the French-speaking part of the Canton of Bern.

Its studios are based in Tavannes, in the district of Moutier.

External links 
 

French-language radio stations in Switzerland